Hit and Runway is a 1999 American comedy film directed by Christopher Livingston. It won best screenplay at the  Los Angeles Independent Film Festival.

Cast

External links
 

1999 films
Films about screenwriters
1999 comedy films
Films about LGBT and Judaism
1990s English-language films